This is a list of book series published by Cambridge University Press.

Anthropology
Among the book series in anthropology published by Cambridge University Press are:

 Atelier d'Anthropologie Sociale
 Biosocial Society Symposium Series
 Cambridge Handbooks in Anthropology
 Cambridge Library Collection - Anthropology
 Cambridge Library Collection - Travel, Europe
 Cambridge Library Collection - Travel, Middle East and Asia Minor
 Cambridge Papers in Social Anthropology
 Cambridge Studies in Cultural Systems
 Cambridge Studies in Oral and Literate Culture
 Cambridge Studies in Social and Cultural Anthropology
 Changing Culture Series
 Culture and Psychology (book series)|Culture and Psychology
 Key Topics in Linguistic Anthropology
 Language Culture and Cognition
 Lewis Henry Morgan Lectures
 New Departures in Anthropology
 New Perspectives on Anthropological and Social Demography
 Publications of the Society for Psychological Anthropology
 Res Monographs in Anthropology and Aesthetics
 Studies in Interactional Sociolinguistics
 Studies in Literacy, the Family, Culture and the State
 University of Cambridge Oriental Publications

Archaeology
Among the book series in archaeology published by Cambridge University Press are:

 Archaeology of the North
 British School at Athens Studies in Greek Antiquity
 British School at Rome Studies
 Cambridge Library Collection - Archaeology
 Cambridge Library Collection - Egyptology
 Cambridge Manuals in Archaeology
 Cambridge Studies in Archaeology
 Cambridge World Archaeology
 Case Studies in Early Societies
 Guides to the Coinage of the Ancient World
 New Directions in Archaeology
 New Directions in Sustainability and Society
 New Studies in Archaeology
 Topics in Contemporary Archaeology

Area studies
Among the book series in area studies published by Cambridge University Press are:

 African Studies
 Global Health Histories
 The International African Library
 New Approaches to African History

Art
Among the book series in the arts published by Cambridge University Press are:

 Cambridge Film Classics
 Cambridge Library Collection - Art and Architecture
 Cambridge Studies in the History of Art
 Contemporary Artists and their Critics
 Fitzwilliam Museum Handbooks
 Fitzwilliam Museum Publications
 Greater Medieval Houses

Chemistry
Among the book series in chemistry published by Cambridge University Press are:

 Cambridge Molecular Science
 Chemistry of Solid State Materials

Classical Studies
Among the book series in classical studies published by Cambridge University Press are.

 Armies of the Ancient World
 British School at Athens Studies in Greek Antiquity
 British School at Rome Studies
 The Cambridge Ancient History
 Cambridge Classical Studies
 Cambridge Classical Texts and Commentaries
 Cambridge Companions to the Ancient World
 Cambridge Galen Translations
 Cambridge Greek and Latin Classics
 Cambridge Greek Testament Commentaries
 The Cambridge History of Classical Literature
 The Cambridge History of Judaism
 The Cambridge History of Political Thought
 Cambridge Intermediate Latin Readers
 Cambridge Introduction to Roman Civilization
 Cambridge Library Collection - Classics
 Cambridge Studies in the Dialogues of Plato
 The Cambridge World History of Slavery
 Classics after Antiquity
 Companions to Ancient Thought
 The Greek Cosmologists
 Greek Culture in the Roman World
 Guides to the Coinage of the Ancient World
 Key Conflicts of Classical Antiquity
 Key Themes in Ancient History
 Key Themes in Ancient Philosophy
 Proclus: Commentary on Plato's Republic
 Proclus: Commentary on Plato's Timaeus
 Reading Greek
 Roman Literature and its Contexts
 Society for New Testament Studies Monograph Series
 Translated Documents of Greece and Rome
 The W. B. Stanford Memorial Lectures
 Yale Classical Studies

Computer Science
Among the book series in computer science published by Cambridge University Press are:

 The Ada Companion Series
 Artificial Intelligence for Social Good
 Breakthroughs in Application Development
 British Computer Society Conference Series
 British Computer Society Workshop Series
 Cambridge Computer Science Texts
 Cambridge International Series on Parallel Computation
 Cambridge Series on Human-Computer Interaction
 Cambridge Tracts in Theoretical Computer Science
 Distinguished Dissertations in Computer Science
 Lecture Notes in Logic
 Perspectives in Logic
 SIGS: Advances in Object Technology
 Studies in Natural Language Processing

Drama and Theatre
Among the book series in drama and the theatre published by Cambridge University Press are:

 The Cambridge History of British Theatre
 Cambridge Studies in Modern Theatre
 Theatre and Performance Theory

Earth and Environmental Sciences
Among the book series in earth and environmental sciences published by Cambridge University Press are:

 Cambridge Atmospheric and Space Science Series
 Cambridge Earth Science Series
 Cambridge Energy and Environment Series
 Cambridge Environmental Chemistry Series
 Cambridge Library Collection - Earth Science
 Cambridge Library Collection - Monographs of the Palaeontographical Society
 Cambridge Paleobiology Series
 Cambridge Topics in Mineral Physics and Chemistry
 Cambridge Topics in Petrology
 Elements of Paleontology
 International Hydrology Series
 New Directions in Sustainability and Society
 Organizations and the Natural Environment
 Special Publications of the International Union of Geodesy and Geophysics
 Studies in Polar Research
 Topics in Remote Sensing
 World and Regional Geology

Economics
50 results in Economics

 The American Law Institute Reporters Studies on WTO Law
 Bilateral and Regional Trade Agreements
 Cambridge Economic Handbooks
 The Cambridge Economic History of Europe
 The Cambridge Economic History of India
 Cambridge Economic History of the United States
 Cambridge International Trade and Economic Law
 Cambridge Studies in Economics, Choice, and Society
 Cambridge Studies in Stratification Economics: Economics and Social Identity
 Cambridge Studies in the Emergence of Global Enterprise
 Cambridge Studies on Governing Knowledge Commons
 Cambridge Surveys of Economic Literature
 Cambridge Tax Law Series
 Churchill Lectures in Economics
 The CICSE Lectures in Growth and Development
 The Collected Writings of John Maynard Keynes
 Comparative Perspectives in Business History
 Contemporary South Asia
 Department of Applied Economics Occasional Papers
 Development Trajectories in Global Value Chains
 Econometric Exercises
 Econometric Society Monographs
 Elements in Austrian Economics
 Elements in Evolutionary Economics
 Elements in Public Economics
 Elements in the Politics of Development
 Federico Caffè Lectures
 Health Economics, Policy and Management
 Historical Perspectives on Modern Economics
 Intellectual Property, Innovation and Economic Development
 International Symposia in Economic Theory and Econometrics
 Japan-US Center UFJ Bank Monographs on International Financial Markets
 Mastering Mathematical Finance
 Mathematics, Finance and Risk
 Modern Cambridge Economics Series
 National Institute of Economic and Social Research Economic and Social Studies
 New Approaches to Economic and Social History
 Oscar Morgenstern Memorial Lectures
 Physics of Society: Econophysics and Sociophysics
 Quantitative Methods for Applied Economics and Business Research
 Raffaele Mattioli Lectures
 The Stone Lectures in Economics
 Studies in Economic History and Policy
 Studies in Economic History and Policy: USA in the Twentieth Century
 Studies in Macroeconomic History
 Themes in Modern Econometrics
 Trade and Development
 The World Since 1980
 World Trade Organization Dispute Settlement Reports
 Wye Studies in Agricultural and Rural Development

Education
3 results in Education

 Cambridge Library Collection - Education
 Cambridge Studies in the Comparative Politics of Education
 Cambridge Texts and Studies in the History of Education

Engineering
21 results in Engineering

 Advances in Microscopy and Microanalysis
 Cambridge Aerospace Series
 Cambridge Engine Technology Series
 Cambridge IISc Series
 Cambridge Library Collection - Physical Sciences
 Cambridge Library Collection - Technology
 Cambridge Ocean Technology Series
 The Cambridge RF and Microwave Engineering Series
 Cambridge Series in Chemical Engineering
 Cambridge Studies in Modern Optics
 Cambridge Studies in Semiconductor Physics and Microelectronic Engineering
 Cambridge Texts in Biomedical Engineering
 The Cambridge Wireless Essentials Series
 Electronics Texts for Engineers and Scientists
 Elements in Emerging Theories and Technologies in Metamaterials
 Elements in Flexible and Large-Area Electronics
 EuMA High Frequency Technologies Series
 MRS-Cambridge Materials Fundamentals
 SIGS: Managing Object Technology
 SIGS Reference Library

Film, Media, Mass Communication
5 results in Film, Media, Mass Communication

 Cambridge Film Handbooks
 Cambridge Studies in Film
 Communication, Society and Politics
 Genres in American Cinema
 National Film Traditions

General Science
10 results in General Science

Geography
15 results in Geography

History
142 results in History

 African Studies
 Afro-Latin America
 Armies of the Ancient World
 Armies of the Great War
 Armies of the Second World War
 Asian Connections
 Australian Army History Series
 British Lives
 Cambridge Centennial of Flight
 The Cambridge China Library
 Cambridge Commonwealth Series
 Cambridge Concise Histories
 Cambridge Essential Histories
 Cambridge Galen Translations
 The Cambridge History of Africa
 Cambridge History of Britain
 The Cambridge History of China
 Cambridge History of Christianity
 The Cambridge History of Communism
 The Cambridge History of Egypt
 Cambridge History of Europe
 The Cambridge History of Ireland
 The Cambridge History of Japan
 The Cambridge History of Latin America
 The Cambridge History of Law in America
 The Cambridge History of Modern European Thought
 Cambridge History of Religions in America
 The Cambridge History of Russia
 The Cambridge History of Scandinavia
 The Cambridge History of Science
 Cambridge History of South Africa
 The Cambridge History of the American Civil War
 The Cambridge History of the Cold War
 The Cambridge History of the First World War
 The Cambridge history of the Native Peoples of the Americas
 The Cambridge History of the Second World War
 Cambridge History of Turkey
 Cambridge History of War
 Cambridge Library Collection - African Studies
 Cambridge Library Collection - British and Irish History, 15th & 16th Centuries
 Cambridge Library Collection - British and Irish History, 19th Century
 Cambridge Library Collection - British and Irish History, General
 Cambridge Library Collection - British & Irish History, 17th & 18th Centuries
 Cambridge Library Collection - East and South-East Asian History
 Cambridge Library Collection - European History
 Cambridge Library Collection - Hakluyt First Series
 Cambridge Library Collection - History
 Cambridge Library Collection - History of Medicine
 Cambridge Library Collection - History of Oceania
 Cambridge Library Collection - Latin American Studies
 Cambridge Library Collection - Maritime Exploration
 Cambridge Library Collection - Medieval History
 Cambridge Library Collection - Naval and Military History
 Cambridge Library Collection - Naval Chronicle
 Cambridge Library Collection - North American History
 Cambridge Library Collection - Perspectives from the Royal Asiatic Society
 Cambridge Library Collection - Rolls
 Cambridge Library Collection - Slavery and Abolition
 Cambridge Library Collection - South Asian History
 Cambridge Library Collection - The Nautical Magazine
 Cambridge Library Collection - Travel and Exploration in Asia
 Cambridge Library Collection - Travel, Europe
 Cambridge Library Collection - Travel, Middle East and Asia Minor
 Cambridge Medieval Textbooks
 Cambridge Middle East Library
 Cambridge Middle East Studies
 Cambridge Military Histories
 Cambridge Modern China Series
 Cambridge Oceanic Histories
 Cambridge Social and Cultural Histories
 Cambridge South Asian Studies
 Cambridge Studies in Chinese History, Literature and Institutions
 Cambridge Studies in Early Modern British History
 Cambridge Studies in Early Modern History
 Cambridge Studies in Economic History
 Cambridge Studies in Economic History - Second Series
 Cambridge Studies in Eighteenth-Century English Literature and Thought
 Cambridge Studies in Indian History and Society
 Cambridge Studies in Islamic Civilization
 Cambridge Studies in Italian History and Culture
 Cambridge Studies in Medieval Life and Thought: Fourth Series
 Cambridge Studies in Medieval Life and Thought: New Series
 Cambridge Studies in Medieval Life and Thought: Third Series
 Cambridge Studies in Modern Economic History
 Cambridge Studies in Population, Economy and Society in Past Time
 Cambridge Studies in Religion and American Public Life
 Cambridge Studies in the History of Medicine
 Cambridge Studies in the History of the People's Republic of China
 Cambridge Studies in US Foreign Relations
 Cambridge Studies on the African Diaspora
 Cambridge Studies on the American South
 The Cambridge Urban History of Britain
 The Cambridge World History
 The Cambridge World History of Slavery
 The China Quarterly Special Issues
 The CICSE Lectures in Growth and Development
 Comprehensive Surveys of Religion
 Contemporary China Institute Publications
 Critical Perspectives on Empire
 Elements in Religion and Violence
 Global and International History
 Global Health Histories
 The Global Middle East
 The Heads of Religious Houses
 A History of the University in Europe
 History of the University of Cambridge
 Human Rights in History
 Interdisciplinary Perspectives on Modern History
 International Review of Social History Supplements
 Medieval European Coinage
 New Approaches to African History
 New Approaches to Asian History
 New Approaches to European History
 New Approaches to the Americas
 New Approaches to the History of Science and Medicine
 New Histories of American Law
 New Studies in Economic and Social History
 New Studies in European History
 Past and Present Publications
 Publications of the German Historical Institute
 Science in History
 Slaveries since Emancipation
 A Social History of England
 Sources of History
 Studies in Australian History
 Studies in Church History
 Studies in Comparative Early Modern History
 Studies in Comparative World History
 Studies in Environment and History
 Studies in Interdisciplinary History
 Studies in Legal History
 Studies in Modern Capitalism
 Studies in North American Indian History
 Studies in the Social and Cultural History of Modern Warfare
 Woodrow Wilson Center Press

Language and Linguistics
27 results in Language and Linguistics

Law
64 results in Law

Life Sciences
52 results in Life Sciences

Literature
63 results in Literature

Management
10 results in Management

Materials Science
2 results in Materials Science

 Elements in Emerging Theories and Technologies in Metamaterials
 MRS-Cambridge Materials Fundamentals

Mathematics
31 results in Mathematics

Medicine
29 results in Medicine

Music
22 results in Music

Philosophy
46 results in Philosophy

Physics and Astronomy
26 results in Physics and Astronomy

Politics and International Relations
81 results in Politics and International Relations

Psychiatry
10 results in Psychiatry

Psychology
23 results in Psychology

Religion
35 results in Religion

Sociology
22 results in Sociology

Statistics and Probability
7 results in Statistics and Probability

 Cambridge Series in Statistical and Probabilistic Mathematics
 Institute of Mathematical Statistics Monographs
 Institute of Mathematical Statistics Textbooks
 International Series on Actuarial Science
 Practical Guides to Biostatistics and Epidemiology
 SemStat Elements

References

External links 
 Browse subjects